Nistoreşti may refer to several places in Romania:

 Nistorești, a commune in Vrancea County
 Nistoreşti, a village in Cozieni Commune, Buzău County
 Nistoreşti, a village in Pantelimon Commune, Constanţa County
 Nistoreşti, a village in Alimpești Commune, Gorj County
 Nistoreşti, a village in Breaza Town, Prahova County

See also 
 Nistor (disambiguation)